Dipteryx alata is a large, undomesticated, edible nut-bearing tree from dryish tropical lowlands in central South America belonging to the legume family, Fabaceae, from the Dipterygeae tribe in the Faboideae subfamily. It is a wild species, widespread across the Cerrado savanna in South America.

Vernacular names
It is known in Spanish as almendro (almond) in Santa Cruz department in southern Bolivia, almendrillo in Pando in northern Bolivia, and shihuahuaco in the Department of Madre de Dios in southern Peru. In both these last two regions it shares the same name with Dipteryx micrantha. Both tree species are also known as mawi in the Ese Eja language spoken there.

The common name baru appears to be the most used in Brazilian Portuguese. A long list of other names used in Brazil have been recorded; some of these names are barujo, coco-feijão, cumaruna, cumarurana, cumbaru, emburena-brava feijão-coco and imburana-brava. A number of names, such as cumaru and pau-cumaru, are shared with the closely related Amazonian D. odorata, the tonka bean or cumaru tree, due to the similarity of the two trees. Harri Lorenzi complied most of these names in 1992, culled from the herbarium sheets he had collected, and the names can be traced to specific regions.

Taxonomy
The German botanist Julius Rudolph Theodor Vogel named the species alata, which means "winged"  and refers to the winged petiole of the leaves. As a legume, this tree belongs to the botanical family Fabaceae; this is also known as Leguminosae, and commonly known as the bean, or pea, family. The Dipterygeae tribe is an early branching of the Faboideae subfamily of the legumes, dating ~58 million years and preceding staple legumes such as soybeans, peas or peanuts by ~10 million years. It is quite distant from other less-known legumes such as Inga, Parkia, Tylosema, or tamarinds).

Description
The tree can measure up to 25 m in height and 0.7 m in diameter.

It has compound leaves with 6 to 14 leaflets. The greenish-white flowers are 6 to 15mm in diameter.

The form of the fruit (a bean pod) is ovoid and contains a juicy flesh within. The fruit has an average weight of 25g and average dimensions of 52.40 ± 4.48mm for length, and 38.31 ± 4.05 mm for width. Of these:
42% is pulp
53% is ligneous endocarp
5% is seed

Distribution
It is native to Bolivia, Brazil, Paraguay and Peru.

Bolivia: It has been recorded in northwestern Bolivia in the province of Abel Iturralde (in northern La Paz Department) and Madre de Dios (in Pando Department), and in southeastern Bolivia in the provinces of Andrés Ibáñez, Chiquitos, Germán Busch, Ichilo, Ñuflo de Chávez, Sara and José Miguel de Velasco (all in Santa Cruz Department). It grows in the tropical savannah of the Chiquitania region. It grows in Noel Kempff Mercado National Park, and is thought to grow in Madidi National Park.

Brazil: It can be found in suitable habitat throughout much of central and western Brazil. It occurs in the north in the states of Pará and Tocantins, in the west in Acre, Amazonas and Rondônia, in the northeast in Bahia, Maranhão, Piauí and possibly Ceará, in the central-west in Distrito Federal, Goiás, Mato Grosso and Mato Grosso do Sul and in the southeast in Minas Gerais, Paraná and the Atlantic coast of São Paulo. According to Siqueira et al. (1992) it is almost extinct in the wild in these last two states, but found almost exclusively planted ex situ.

Paraguay: It has been recorded from central eastern Paraguay in the departments of Amambay and Concepción.

Peru: It has been recorded in Peru in the departments of Huánuco (Pachitea Province), Loreto (Maynas and Ucayali provinces) and Madre de Dios (Tambopata Province).

Ecology

Habitat
Of all the species of Dipteryx this species has the most southerly distribution and is the only one which grows in regions with marked seasons.

It is found in the Amazon, Caatinga and central Brazilian savannah (called Cerrado in Brazil) phytogeographical regions. It grows mostly in the vegetative associations of Cerrado, but also in tropical riverine and/or gallery forests, seasonally semi-deciduous tropical forests and Amazonian savannahs.

It grows in areas with soil of low fertility in northern Bolivia, but in Goiás it is typical for Cerrado areas with more soil fertility, where it occurs in a uniform manner. It may reliably be used as an indicator species of such conditions (Macedo, 1992), not occurring where the fertility is naturally very low.

Interspecific relationships
Unlike most legumes, baru trees harbor no symbiotic nitrogen-fixing bacteria in root nodules and in fact depend on fixing nitrogen from water tables with their deep roots.

A tree will produce about 150 kg of fruit per harvest in alternating years, being pollinated by native bees. The fruits are a food source for birds and small mammals, such as rodents, bats, and monkeys.

Uses

It is used as lumber, for charcoal production and for shade in pastures, by the indigenous peoples of its range. The fruits are often used as feed for cattle. The seeds are a nutritious part of the local communities' diet.

According to Alexiades some among the Ese Eja people, which have recently started using the hallucinogenic drug ayahuasca, see visions of concrete houses under the influence of this drug, which according to a source interviewed by Alexiades represents a tree of this species. Alexiades theorises that this tree is to be considered a "teacher plant" in the new ayahuasca shamanism that the Ese Eja have adopted and that it, in specific, and trees in general, represents the "future".

Uses for the fruit can be summarized as:

Cultivation
A tree has a useful lifespan of 60 years.

The baru tree grows wild, but there are recent attempts at large-scale cultivation. The fruit matures shortly before rain season in the cerrado, which could range between June to October depending on its latitude.

Its brown fruits are either collected from the ground or picked from the tree when they are almost ripe.

Baru fruit extraction is a profitable alternative to deforestation. Several cerrado communities rely on the sale of baru fruits and seeds as a source of revenue.

Food and nutrition
Out of the fruit, the pulp is sweet and nutritious. It can be consumed fresh, but is also used to manufacture jams, jellies, and liquors. Baru seeds are high in fat, proteins, dietary fibers, magnesium, iron and zinc.

Baru seed

The baru seed, also known as the baru nut, baru almond, or chiquitanian almond, is the seed of Dipteryx alata Vogel. It is classified as a tertiary grain legume, as its supply chain is still very limited. Atypically among legume crop plants, baru seeds develop from a tree and are dispersed by animals, particularly birds, bats, and rodents.

Baru seeds are similar in taste to peanuts and are often served in similar ways in Western cuisines. The botanical definition of a "nut" is a fruit whose ovary wall becomes hard at maturity. Using this criterion, the baru seed is not a nut given its unique fruit. However, it was initially translated in English as "nut" due to the first internationally published articles translating the word "castanha" from Portuguese.

Baru seeds are highly nutritious and rich in: antioxidants (mainly tocopherols), protein, dietary fiber, omega-6, omega-3, magnesium, potassium, phosphorus and zinc.

Baru seeds should be served after heating either as boiling, baking or roasting, which deactivates a trypsin inhibitor enzyme. The trypsin inhibitor, if not deactivated, will not allow for the high protein content in baru seeds to be digested.

Baru seeds are used mostly as an occasional salted snack by local communities, due to the difficulty of extracting them manually. In Canada and the United States, baru seeds are used as a snack and ingredient and are slowly being adopted as a peanut substitute. Individually, they are eaten dry-roasted.

Allergies
Baru seeds come from one of the earliest branches of legumes (called Dipterygeae), and did not evolve some characteristics of more derived, commonly consumed legumes. This applies to proteins similar to allergenic ones present in peanuts, soybeans or peas, for example, bearing no risk of cross-reactivity. They are also unrelated to tree nuts.

However, due to their early-stage processing chain, there is a possibility of cross-contamination with native nuts from Brazil such as cashew nuts and Brazil nuts if processed in a shared facility.

Conservation
According to D.K. Requena Suarez, an assessor writing for the IUCN in 2021, this species is vulnerable due to over-collection of the seeds, usage as timber, and habitat loss by intensive farming. However, the IUCN uses a restricted distribution instead of the actual range.

References

Further reading

alata
Vulnerable plants
Trees of Brazil
Trees of Bolivia
Trees of Peru
Taxonomy articles created by Polbot